Boophis rufioculis is a species of frog in the family Mantellidae.
It is endemic to Madagascar.
Its natural habitats are subtropical or tropical moist lowland forests, subtropical or tropical moist montane forests, and rivers.
It is threatened by habitat loss.

References

rufioculis
Endemic frogs of Madagascar
Amphibians described in 1997
Taxonomy articles created by Polbot